Theodorus Netscher (1661, Bordeaux – 1728, Hulst), (alias: Theodor/Theodoor/de Fransche Netscher) was an 18th-century painter from the northern Netherlands.

Biography
According to Johan van Gool he was taught to paint from his father, and though he was born in Bordeaux, he was trained mostly in the Hague and came to be known as the "French Netscher" not because of his place of birth, but because of his later work in Paris, where he lived from 1680-1699.

According to the RKD he was the son and pupil of Caspar Netscher, and the older brother of the painters Constantijn and Anthonie Netscher. He worked in The Hague and made trips to Paris and England, before moving to Hulst where he later died. He consorted with Roger de Piles, either in the Hague or Paris. He is known for portraits and interior wall decorations.

References

Theodorus Netscher on Artnet

1661 births
1728 deaths
18th-century Dutch painters
18th-century Dutch male artists
Dutch male painters
Artists from Bordeaux